Oncidium geertianum is a species of orchid native to central and southwestern Mexico.

References 

geertianum
Endemic orchids of Mexico